The Utah Utes football program is a college football team that competes in the Pac-12 Conference (Pac-12) of the Football Bowl Subdivision (FBS) of NCAA Division I and represents the University of Utah. The Utah college football program began in 1892 and has played home games at the current site of Rice-Eccles Stadium in Salt Lake City since 1927. They have won 28 conference championships in five conferences during their history, and, as of the end of the 2022 season, they have a cumulative record of 711 wins, 476 losses, and 31 ties (.596). 

The Utes have a record of 17–8 in major bowl games which is ranked fourth in the nation in bowl games win percentage (minimum 10 bowl games played list). Among Utah's bowl appearances are two games from the Bowl Championship Series (BCS): the Fiesta Bowl in 2005 and the Sugar Bowl in 2009. In the CFP era, they made repeat Rose Bowl appearances in 2022 and 2023. In the 2005 Fiesta Bowl, Utah, led by coach Urban Meyer, defeated the Pittsburgh Panthers 35–7, and in the 2009 Sugar Bowl, headed by coach Kyle Whittingham, they defeated coach Nick Saban and the Alabama Crimson Tide 31–17. During those seasons, Utah was a member of the Mountain West Conference, whose champion does not receive an automatic invitation to a BCS bowl. The Utes were the first team from a conference without an automatic bid to play in a BCS bowl game—colloquially known as being a BCS Buster—and the first BCS Buster to play in a second BCS Bowl.

History

Early history (1892–1967)

During Utah's first year in 1892, the Utes won one game and lost two, including a loss to future rival Utah State. The first two games were against the local YMCA, but no one knows when these contests took place. Utah's first game against another college, Utah Agricultural College (now called "Utah State"), was scheduled for Thanksgiving Day, but was postponed one day due to a snow storm. Utah A.C. won 12–0. Utah did not field a team in 1893, but resumed playing in 1894. One other season in Utah's history has been canceled: in 1918 Utah did not field a football team due to World War I. Utah had its first sustained success when, in 1904, it hired Joe Maddock to coach football, as well as basketball and track. During his six seasons, he coached the football team to a record of 28–9–1 (.750). The school enthusiastically embraced the former Michigan Wolverine. In 1905, the Galveston Daily News reported, "He has the Mormons all football crazy. He has written here to say that his team now holds the championship of Utah, Montana, Wyoming, and the greater part of Colorado. When he won the hard-fought battle with Colorado College a week ago the Salt Lake City papers said: 'Maddock' is a new way of saying success. The great Michigan tackle has taken boys who never saw a football before and made them the star players of the Rocky Mountain States." In early 1910, Maddock retired from coaching (although he later coached a year at Oregon.) Fred Bennion coached the Utes from 1910 to 1913. 1910 was also Utah's first season as a member of a conference, the Rocky Mountain Athletic Conference (RMAC). Bennion finished with a record of 16–8–3 (.648) during his four seasons. Nelson Norgren finished with a record of 13–11 (.542) during his coaching years from 1913 to 1917. Utah did not field a team for the 1918 season because of a shortage of players due to World War I. When play resumed in 1919, Thomas Fitzpatrick started his football coaching career. He continued as the football coach until the end of the 1924 season. His teams finished with a record of 23–17–3 (.570). Utah won their first conference championships in these early years, in 1922.

Ike Armstrong was originally hired to coach both the men's basketball team and the football team. While he lasted only two years as basketball coach, in football he amassed a record of 141–55–15 (.704) during his 25 years as head coach, which places him second among Utah head coaches for total wins. Under Armstrong, Utah won thirteen conference championships, including six in a row from 1928 to 1933 in the Rocky Mountain Athletic Conference. His teams produced three undefeated and untied seasons (1926, 1929, and 1930) and two more seasons where Utah was undefeated but tied (1928 and 1941). The 1930 team only allowed 20 points by the opposition all year (2.5 points per game), but scored 340 points (42.5 points per game.) On offense, they averaged 463 yards a game that year, but were unable to find a postseason opponent. Armstrong coached the Utes to their first bowl in the 1939 Sun Bowl defeating New Mexico 26–0. The MSC was popularly called the "Big Seven Conference", and then after Colorado left following the 1947 season, popularly called the "Skyline Conference" or "Skyline Six". Utah played in and won its first bowl game, the 1939 Sun Bowl, during Armstrong's tenure in the MSC. Armstrong also helped keep the team in existence during World War II even though most of the other schools in the conference decided not to field teams from 1943 to 1945. Armstrong also oversaw the opening of Ute Stadium. As the popularity of Utah football grew, Cumming's Field, an 11,000 capacity stadium that was just south of Presidents Circle on campus, no longer met Utah's needs. The stadium was part of a larger trend of universities building larger stadiums during the 1920s. Ute Stadium initially had a 20,000 seat capacity and a cost of $125,000. After the 1949 season, Armstrong accepted a job at University of Minnesota as their athletic director. In 1957 Armstrong was inducted in the College Football Hall of Fame.

Under "Cactus" Jack Curtice, head coach from 1950 to 1957, Utah enjoyed moderate success. During his eight seasons as Utah head coach, the Utes compiled a record of 45–32–4 (.580) and won four conference championships in the Skyline Conference. In contrast to his predecessor Ike Armstrong, Curtice focused his attention on offense and continually tinkered with his split-T offense. His teams are perhaps best known for popularizing the Utah Pass, which is an overhand forward shovel pass of the ball. The play is commonly used today by teams which use a spread offense. Quarterback Lee Grosscup caught the attention of the east coast press when he and the Utes had a close 33–39 loss to top ten program Army at West Point, New York. Grosscup threw for 316 yards against a tough Army defense in an era where most teams seldom passed the ball. Despite losing, Curtice referred to the game as "The time we beat Army." After Curtice left to coach Stanford, Ray Nagel took the helm. He coached for eight seasons from 1958 to 1965 before leaving for Iowa. During his tenure, the Utes had a record of 42–39–1 (.518) and were co-conference champions of the Western Athletic Conference in 1964. As a reward, the Utes garnered an invitation to Atlantic City to play in the 1964 Liberty Bowl, which was the first major college football game held indoors. Utah dominated the game against West Virginia from start to finish and won by the score of 32–6. Utah finished the season ranked No. 14 in the Coaches' Poll. Nagel's replacement, Mike Giddings, posted a record of 9–12 (.429) during the 1966 and 1967 seasons before resigning. Giddings had previously been an assistant coach at USC under head coach John McKay and brought with him hopes that the Utes football program would be turned around, but an inability to get recruiting going led to on-field issues that essentially prevented any chance of viable football success.

Bill Meek era (1968–1973)
Bill Meek, coach from 1968 to 1973, failed to substantially improve the Utes, and they went 33–31 (.516) over his six seasons before he was fired. The Utes' best season under Meek was an 8–2 campaign in 1969. Meek, like his predecessor, Giddings, failed to get any sort of recruiting momentum which resulted in subpar and mediocre team performances year in and year out.

Tom Lovat era (1974–1976)

Utah replaced Meek with Tom Lovat, who has the lowest winning percentage among coaches of the Utah football program (with the exception of Walter Shoup who only coached one game in 1895.) During his tenure from 1974 to 1976, his teams posted a 5–28 record (.152), and had a 0–6 record against in-state rivals Utah State and Brigham Young (BYU). To make matters worse, these years coincided with the emergence of BYU football under the tutelage of LaVell Edwards.

Wayne Howard era (1977–1981)
Next in line was Wayne Howard, who coached from 1977 to 1981. He performed substantially better than his predecessor and his Ute teams posted a record of 30–24–2 (.554). Despite a record of 8–2–1 in his final season and being in contention for the Western Athletic Conference Championship, Howard resigned at the end of the season. He cited several reasons for leaving, but he particularly disliked the BYU–Utah rivalry.

Chuck Stobart era (1982–1984)
The Utes lost whatever progress they made under Howard during the Chuck Stobart years, 1982–1984. During his tenure, the Utes compiled a 16–17–1 record (.485), and saw hated rival BYU earn a National Championship. Though the Stobart era wasn't the worst period in Utes football history, it was marked by the continued mediocrity that had plagued the program in recent years. Stobart's 1982 and 1983 teams posted 5–6 records with only decent offenses and average defenses to show for it. The 1984 Utes improved slightly to a 6–5–1 record, but fans and administration were impatient, prompting Stobart's resignation.

Jim Fassel era (1985–1989)
The program regressed further during the Jim Fassel era from 1985 to 1989, with a 25–33 record (.431). His teams were marked by high scoring offenses and abysmal defenses. In 1989, his final season, the Utes scored 30.42 points per game, but allowed 43.67 points per game. The lone bright spot of his tenure was a 57–28 upset of nationally ranked BYU to end the 1988 season, which was dubbed by Ute fans as The Rice Bowl.

Ron McBride era (1990–2002)
 When Ron McBride arrived from Arizona in 1990, he inherited a program that had only had five winning seasons in the previous 16 years, and had not posted a winning season in WAC play since 1985. Later, he said that expectations had dropped so low that Ute fans were content to not be embarrassed–particularly against BYU–and finish in the middle of the WAC.

He didn't take long to turn the program around. In 1991, his second season, he posted a 7–5 record, but a blowout loss to rival BYU kept them out of a bowl. A year later, he led the Utes to the 1992 Copper Bowl, the program's first bowl appearance in 28 years. He took the Utes to six bowl games during his tenure, a noteworthy feat considering the Utes had played in just three bowl games in their entire history prior to his arrival. His teams posted bowl wins over USC, Arizona and Fresno State. During his tenure at Utah, McBride posted an overall record of 88–63 (.582), at the time the second-most wins by a coach in the history of Utah football. The Utes reached their peak under McBride when they finished the 1994 season ranked No. 10 in the AP Poll and No. 8 in the Coaches' Poll and recorded a 16–13 victory over Arizona in the Freedom Bowl. That season, the Utes beat four teams who ended the season ranked: Oregon, Colorado State, BYU, and Arizona. In 1995, Utah won a share of its first conference title in 31 years, when it finished in a four-way tie for the WAC title. In 1999, Utah was again co-conference champion, this time finishing in a three-way tie for the first Mountain West Conference title.

McBride's tenure at Utah began to falter in 2000. The Utes were the favorites to win the Mountain West after tying for the conference title a year earlier, but lost their first four games en route to a 4–7 record, their first losing record since McBride's arrival. Season-ticket sales fell 15% as a result, problematic given the costly rebuilding of Rice-Eccles Stadium, and pressure rose to fire McBride. The Utes rebounded in 2001, achieving a winning record and scoring an upset win in the 2001 Las Vegas Bowl over the USC Trojans in Pete Carroll's first season. With the Utes slipping again into a losing season, McBride was fired by Utah after the 2002 season and replaced by Urban Meyer. Despite the inglorious end to McBride's tenure, he is credited with laying the foundation for Utah's rise to national prominence, which came under his successors.

Urban Meyer era (2003–2004)

On December 12, 2002, Bowling Green head coach Urban Meyer was named Utah's head coach. In his inaugural season, the Utes showed a knack for winning close games. Meyer implemented a spread offense attack and with quarterback Alex Smith led Utah to a 10–2 record, an outright MWC championship (their first outright conference title in 46 years), and a 17–0 victory in the Liberty Bowl over Southern Miss. They finished the season ranked No. 21 in both major polls. He also earned honors as The Sporting News National Coach of the Year, the first Utes' coach to do so.

 
In his second season as head coach, the Utes repeated as conference champions. They were a high scoring team; they scored 544 total points on the season, which is a team record, and averaged 45.33 points per game. They played key out-of-conference games against Texas A&M, Arizona, and North Carolina, and they won every game by at least two touchdowns (14 points). After completing an undefeated season, Utah became the first team from a non-automatically qualifying BCS conference to play in a BCS bowl. The Utes played Big East Conference champion Pittsburgh in the 2005 Fiesta Bowl, winning 35–7. The Utes finished the season ranked No. 4 in the AP poll. Later that year, Alex Smith, who during the 2003 and 2004 seasons compiled a 21–1 record as a starting quarterback, was drafted No. 1 by the San Francisco 49ers in the 2005 NFL Draft. He became the first player from a college in the state of Utah to ever be drafted first. After two years with Utah, Urban Meyer left after the 2005 Fiesta Bowl to coach Florida. His record at Utah was 22–2 (.917), which is the highest winning percentage among Utah head coaches.

Kyle Whittingham era (2005–present)

Utah is currently coached by Kyle Whittingham, who was promoted from defensive coordinator following Utah's undefeated 2004 regular season. Whittingham served as the co-head coach in the 2005 Fiesta Bowl, helping Utah to defeat Pittsburgh.

During Whittingham's first twelve years as head coach, the Utes recorded a 104–50 (.675) overall record and 60–42 (.588) in conference play, and won 10 of their 11 bowl games: the 2005 Emerald Bowl, the 2006 Armed Forces Bowl, the 2007 Poinsettia Bowl, the 2009 Sugar Bowl, the 2009 Poinsettia Bowl, the 2011 Sun Bowl, the 2014 Las Vegas Bowl, the 2015 Las Vegas Bowl, and the 2016 Foster Farms Bowl. Utah lost the 2010 Las Vegas Bowl. Prior to his tenure as head coach, Whittingham worked for 11 years as an assistant coach at Utah; the final ten years were as the defensive coordinator. Thus far, in his 23 years with the program, Utah has compiled a 189–91 record (.675), played in 16 bowl games (winning 14), captured five conference titles, won one Pac-12 South Division co-championship, and finished in the Top-10 three times. In 2008, Utah posted a record of 13–0 on their way to winning the MWC Championship, and they were the only undefeated team in the Football Bowl Subdivision. During the regular season, the Utes beat Michigan on the road and Oregon State, TCU, and BYU at home. Their undefeated 2008 season resulted in an invitation to the 2009 Sugar Bowl, which made them the first BCS non-AQ conference school to be invited to a second BCS bowl; Utah won the Sugar Bowl and beat heavily favored Alabama by a score of 31–17. Four of the teams Utah beat ended the season in the Coaches' and AP Polls: Oregon State, TCU, BYU, and Alabama. Both TCU and Alabama ended in the Top-10. In the final Coaches' Poll and AP Poll, Utah finished at No. 4 and No. 2, respectively, for their highest ranking in each poll ever. They were declared the national champions by the Anderson/Hester Poll, an NCAA recognized selector, but do not claim this title.

On June 17, 2010, Utah agreed to join the then Pac-10. The Utes officially became the 12th member of the Conference on July 1, 2011. Joining along with Colorado, these teams were the first additions to the league since 1978. In 2021, Utah posted an 8–1 record in conference play to win the South division before crushing Oregon by a 38–10 final in the conference title game, though they would narrowly lose their first Rose Bowl appearance in a high-scoring bout with Ohio State. In 2022, Utah defeated USC in the conference title game 47–24 to win back-to-back championships.

Conference affiliations
Utah has been a member of the following conferences.

 Independent (1892–1909)
 Rocky Mountain Athletic Conference (1910–1937)
 Mountain States Conference (1938–1961)
 Western Athletic Conference (1962–1998)
 Mountain West Conference (1999–2010)
 Pac-12 Conference (2011–present)

Championships

National championships

In 2008 the Utes were Mountain West Conference champions, undefeated, and ranked No. 7 in the final regular season AP and Coaches polls. They were not selected to play in the 2009 BCS National Championship Game; as second-time "BCS Busters" they were matched up against Alabama in the Sugar Bowl.

Following their win over the No. 4 Crimson Tide and Boise State's loss in the Poinsettia Bowl, the Utes ended the season 13–0 as the nation's only undefeated team. In the final post-bowl AP Poll they were ranked No. 2, with 16 first place votes, behind No. 1 Florida's 48.

Utah head coach Kyle Whittingham ranked the Utes No. 1 in protest on his final Coaches Poll ballot, ignoring an AFCA agreement that each voting coach should award the BCS champion first place. The Utes placed No. 4 in the final Coaches Poll.

Following the season the Utes were selected as national champions by two NCAA-designated major selectors. The school does not claim this title.

Conference championships
Utah has won 26 conference championships in five different conferences during their history.

† Co-championship

Division championships
Utah has won four division championships, all in the South division of the Pac-12 Conference.

† Co-championship
|- 
| 2022 
|USC || W 47–24
|}

Bowl games

The Utah Utes have played in 25 NCAA sanctioned major bowl games with a record of 17–8 through the 2022 season. Additionally, the Utes as played in the 1947 Pineapple Bowl, which was not sanctioned by NCAA as a bowl game.

† The NCAA did not sanction the 1947 Pineapple Bowl and counts as a regular season game in official NCAA statistics.

Stadium

Utah's home games have been played at Rice-Eccles Stadium since 1998. It occupies the footprint of the Utes' longtime home, Rice Stadium. The older facility was built in 1927 as Ute Stadium and opened with a Utah win over Colorado Mines. In 1972, the stadium was rechristened Rice Stadium in honor of Robert L. Rice, who had donated money for a recently completed renovation.

When Salt Lake City was awarded the 2002 Winter Olympics in 1995, it was obvious that Rice Stadium was not suitable to serve as the main stadium. However, it had been showing its age for some time before then. It was decided to completely overhaul the stadium and bring it up to modern standards. After the 1997 season, Rice Stadium was almost completely demolished, with the old timber, concrete and earth-fill facility replaced by a modern steel, concrete and glass stadium. The south end zone bleachers, built in 1982, are all that remains of the old stadium.

Banking magnate Spence Eccles gave money for the 1998 renovation, which expanded the number of seats to its current capacity of 45,817 and improved the press box, so the university added his last name to the stadium's name.

The Ken Garff Performance Zone will open in 2021.  The project will create a premium experience in the south end zone of the stadium. The much-anticipated project that will enclose the south end of Rice-Eccles Stadium, add unique premium spaces to the venue and increase capacity to 51,444 was announced in November 2018. In April 2019 the Garff family generously pledged $17.5 million toward the $80 million project that will transform the home of Utah football and provide a world-class student-athlete experience.

Rivalries

BYU

The Holy War refers to the annual football game with BYU, within the larger Utah–BYU rivalry. Despite its religious overtones, fans and journalists continue to use the name, and it was recognized by SI.com as the No. 6 best nickname for a rivalry game. BYU does not recognize the first six meetings that were held 1896–1898, which the schools split 3–3. BYU argues that because it was then known as Brigham Young Academy those games do not count in the series record. However, BYU recognizes its founding date as October 16, 1875.

Utah dominated the early years of the series. From 1922 until 1971, the Utes lost to BYU five times, won 38 times, with four ties. That changed when BYU hired LaVell Edwards as head coach. From 1972, Edwards' first year as head coach, to 1992, Utah went 2–19 against BYU. Since 1993, Utah has beaten BYU 19 times and lost 8 times. 2021 saw BYU snap its nine-game losing streak to Utah by a score of 26–17 in the Cougars favor.  Utah and BYU will next meet in the 2024 season.

In games recognized by both schools since 1922, Utah leads the series 59–32–4 through the 2021 season.

Utah State

 
The Battle of the Brothers refers to the rivalry between Utah and Utah State. The two teams have a long running football series. Both programs played their first game in history by playing each other on November 25, 1892, a game which Utah State won 12–0. The teams played every year from 1944 to 2009 before a hiatus in the series took place. The game has had five contests since the 2009 hiatus with Utah being 4–1 in that time. The teams presently have no games scheduled. Utah has won 22 of the last 25 games.

Utah leads the series 79–30–4.

Colorado

Despite not having played each other in nearly 50 years prior to the 2011–12 season, Utah and Colorado maintain a storied rivalry that was reignited with the admission of both teams into the Pac-12. Prior to the discontinuance of the rivalry in 1963, the two teams had played each other 57 times beginning in 1903, with Colorado leading the rivalry 30–24–3. This included an upset by Utah in 1962, when Colorado was ranked No. 8 in the nation. The two teams have discussed creating a trophy to "speed up" the development of the rivalry. There have been three games since joining the Pac-12 Conference that have had division title implications. In the 2011 game, Colorado defeated Utah 17–14, denying the Utes an opportunity to play for the Pac-12 Championship. In 2016, Colorado defeated Utah in Boulder 27–22 to secure its first Pac-12 South title. The 2018 iteration saw Utah defeat Colorado in Boulder 30–7 to help secure its first outright Pac-12 South title.

Utah leads the series 33-32-3 through the 2021 season.

2022 schedule

Traditions

Blues Brothers' theme
Just before the third quarter for each home game, the Utah marching band plays the Blues Brothers theme (Otis Redding's "I Can't Turn You Loose") while a female fan dances in front of them. Originally, the song was played between the third and fourth quarters, but Utah officials moved it to halftime at the start of the 2012 season. The tradition was started by "Bubbles", an elderly fan who danced enthusiastically to the song when the band first played it and thereby helped energize the crowd. The crowd so enjoyed the song and Bubbles' performance that it soon became a tradition. After years of doing her dance, Bubbles retired so "Crazy Lady" took over. Crazy Lady received her nickname from the MUSS, which is the "Mighty Utah Student Section". Before the Blues Brothers' theme begins, the MUSS chants for Crazy Lady to do her dance. Crazy Lady finds her nickname "endearing."

Ute Thunder
Since 1968, the University of Utah's Army ROTC department has operated a cannon on the sidelines called Ute Thunder. A few ROTC cadets compose the cannon crew, which is trained to fire the cannon. After each Utah score, the cannon crew fires a 10-gauge shotgun blank. The cannon was built in 1904 and was used during World War I for training. The cannon was refurbished in 2003 to repair the firing mechanism and wooden wheels.

22 Seconds of Loudness 
Since the start of 2021 Football season, a moment of loudness takes place between the third and fourth quarters of every home football game. The tradition was started to honor Ty Jordan, the Utah running back who died during the 2020 offseason. Ty Jordan wore the number 22 - thus 22 seconds of loudness was born. The tradition was later updated to tribute Aaron Lowe, a Utah CB who was a victim of a fatal shooting during the 2021 football season. Lowe was the recipient of the Ty Jordan memorial scholarship and wore the number 22 to honor Jordan.

Notable players

Retired numbers

Notes

Lettered players 
Years in parentheses are the years the player lettered in football with Utah.
 Jack Johnson (1930–1932) — Pro Bowl offensive tackle
 Larry Wilson (1957–1959) — Pro Football Hall of Fame defensive back
 George Seifert (1959) — two time Super Bowl winning head coach
 Dave Costa (1961–1962) — four time AFL All-Pro defensive tackle
 Roy Jefferson (1962–1964) — three time Pro Bowl wide receiver
 Bob Trumpy (1966) — Pro Bowl tight end and color commentator for NFL broadcasts
 Norm Chow (1965–1967) — Broyles Award winner for best assistant coach in college football
 Manny Fernandez (1965–1967) — second team All-Pro defensive tackle and starter on Miami's No-Name Defense
 Norm Thompson (1969–1970) — cornerback for nine seasons in the NFL
 Marv Bateman (1969–1971) — second team All Pro punter
 Steve Odom (1971–1973) — Pro Bowl wide receiver
 Del "Popcorn" Rodgers (1978–1981) — third round NFL Running back for San Francisco 49ers won Super Bowl XXIII
 Scott Mitchell (1987–1989) — quarterback for eleven seasons in the NFL
 Jamal Anderson (1992–1993) — All Pro running back for the Atlanta Falcons during Super Bowl XXXIII
 Luther Elliss (1991–1994) — Pro Bowl defensive tackle
 Kevin Dyson (1994–1997) — starting wide receiver for the Tennessee Titans during Super Bowl XXXIV
 Chris Fuamatu-Ma'afala (1995–1997)— Running Back and sixth round NFL Draft Selection Pittsburgh Steelers
 Barry Sims (1995–1996) — starting Guard for the Oakland Raiders Super Bowl XXXVII
 Mike Anderson (1998–1999) — 2000 NFL Offensive Rookie of the Year
 Ma'ake Kemoeatu (1998–2001) — 3 year Starter at Utah current Defensive Tackle Baltimore Ravens Super Bowl XLVII
 Andre Dyson (1997–2000) — cornerback with 22 interceptions in the NFL
 Steve Smith (1999–2000) — three time All-Pro wide receiver with the Carolina Panthers
 Jordan Gross (1998–2002) — All-Pro offensive tackle with the Carolina Panthers
 Chris Kemoeatu (2001–2004) – first team All-American 2004 sixth round NFL draft pick Pittsburgh Steelers
 Alex Smith (2002–2004) — Heisman Trophy finalist, first pick of the 2005 NFL Draft
 Eric Weddle (2003–2006)— All-Pro free safety with the San Diego Chargers
 Brian Johnson (2004–2005, 2007–2008) — quarterback with most wins in school history
 Louie Sakoda (2005–2008) — consensus All-American placekicker and All-American punter
 Sean Smith (2006–2008) — Miami Dolphins cornerback and second round pick 2009 draft
 Paul Kruger (2007–2008) — All-MWC defensive lineman, Baltimore Ravens second round draft pick
 Zane Beadles (2006–2008) — All-MWC Left Guard, First team All-American [FWAA] Denver Broncos second round NFL draft pick, 2013 Pro Bowl
 Star Lotulelei (2010–2012) — consensus first team All-American Defensive Tackle, All-Pac-12, Carolina Panthers first round NFL draft pick
 Tom Hackett (2012–2015) — 2014 and 2015 winner of the Ray Guy Award for the nation's best punter and named to the Pac-12 All-Century Team
 Mitch Wishnowsky (2016–2019) — 2016 winner of the Ray Guy Award for the nation's best punter

Future non-conference opponents
Announced schedules as of January 17, 2020.

References

External links

 
 Football Video Collection at University of Utah Digital Library, Marriott Library Special Collections

 
American football teams established in 1892
1892 establishments in Utah Territory